Helen Roseveare (21 September 1925 – 7 December 2016) was an English Christian missionary, doctor and author. She worked with Worldwide Evangelization Crusade in the Congo from 1953 to 1973, including part of the period of political instability in the early 1960s. She practised medicine and also trained others in medical work.

Biography
Helen Roseveare was born in Haileybury College in Hertfordshire, England in 1925. Her father was Martin Roseveare, the designer of ration books for the United Kingdom used during the Second World War. Her brother, Bob Roseveare, was a wartime codebreaker. She became a Christian as a medical student at Newnham College, Cambridge in 1945. She was involved with the Cambridge Inter-Collegiate Christian Union, attending prayer meetings, Bible study classes and evangelical events.

After completing her studies, Roseveare applied to WEC to be a medical missionary. In 1953, she went to the Congo, where she was assigned to the north-east provinces. She built a combination hospital/ training center in Ibambi in the early 1950s, then relocated to Nebobongo, living in an old leprosy camp, where she built another hospital. After conflict with other staff at the hospital, she returned to England in 1958.

She returned to the Congo in 1960. In 1964 she was taken prisoner by rebel forces and she remained a prisoner for five months, enduring beatings and rapes. She left the Congo and headed back to England after her release but returned to the Congo in 1966 to assist in the rebuilding of the nation. She helped establish a new medical school and hospital, as the other hospitals that she built had been destroyed, and served there until she left in 1973. 
 
After her return from Africa, she had a worldwide ministry speaking and writing. She was a plenary speaker at the Urbana Missions Convention three times. Her life of service was portrayed in the 1989 film Mama Luka Comes Home.
Her touching story about the prayer of Ruth, 10-year-old African girl, for a hot water bottle to save a premature newborn baby after its mother had died has been widely forwarded by email. She survived rape and trial during the Congolese civil war in 1964 because of the intervention of the villagers she had helped previously.

Roseveare died on 7 December 2016 aged 91 in Northern Ireland.

Publications 
Doctor among Congo Rebels (1965), Lutterworth Press London
 Give me this Mountain (1966), Christian Focus Publications
 Enough, Christian Focus Publications
 He gave us a Valley (1976), Christian Focus Publications
 Living Sacrifice, Christian Focus Publications
 Living Faith, Christian Focus Publications
 Living Holiness, Christian Focus Publications
 Digging Ditches, Christian Focus Publications
 Living Stones (1988), WEC Publications
 Living Fellowship (1992), Hodder & Stoughton
 Count it All Joy (2017), 10Publishing

 Further reading 
 Burgess, Alan, Daylight must come : the story of Dr Helen Roseveare, London : Joseph, (1975); pbk. London : Pan Books, (1977), .
 Lagerborg, Mary Beth, Though Lions Roar: The Story of Helen Roseveare : Missionary Doctor to the Congo, (Faith's Adventurers), .
 Isaac, Peter, A History of Evangelical Christianity in Cornwall'', — privately published (Polperro) by the author (2001).

Video
 Mama Luka Comes Home original by CTA
 Mama Luka Comes Home Cross.TV

References

External links
 Helen Roseveare's seminar on 'maintaining spirituality'
 A Call for the Perseverance of the Saints delivered at Desiring God's 2007 National Conference
 Message at the Urbana 76 Conference
 Article of Tribute on occasion of her death

1925 births
2016 deaths
Alumni of Newnham College, Cambridge
English Protestant missionaries
English evangelicals
Protestant missionaries in the Democratic Republic of the Congo
Female Christian missionaries
British expatriates in the Democratic Republic of the Congo